The Bodo-Garo languages are a branch of Sino-Tibetan languages,  spoken primarily in Northeast India and parts of Bangladesh.

The Bodo-Garo languages form four groups: Bodo, Garo, Koch and Deori.  Garo-Bodo languages were historically very widespread throughout the Brahmaputra Valley and in what are now the northern parts of Bangladesh, and it is speculated that the proto-Bodo-Garo language was the lingua franca of the Brahmaputra valley before it was replaced by Assamese language, to which it has made major contributions.

Branches

The Boro-Garo languages were identified in the Grierson's Language Survey of India, and the names of the languages and their modern equivalents are given below in the table.

Sub groups
The Garo-Boro languages have been further divided into four subgroups by Burling.
Koch languages: Atong, Koch, Ruga, Rabha
Garo languages: Garo, Megam
Bodo languages: Bodo, Dimasa, Barman, Tiwa, Kokborok (Tripuri), Kachari, Moran
Deori language 

Old Hajong may have been a Garo-Boro language.

Barman is a recently discovered Garo-Boro language.

Boro is an associate official language of the state of Assam. Kokborok (Tripuri) is one of the official languages of the state of Tripura. Garo is an associate official language of Meghalaya. Megam has been strongly influenced by Khasic languages, while Deori-Chutia by the Idu Mishmi language.

Languages of the family feature verb-final word order.  There is some flexibility in the order of the arguments, but a nominative–accusative distinction is marked with post-nominal clitics.  The languages also prefix classifiers to numerals modifying nouns. tense, aspect and mood are indicated using verbal suffixes.

Origins
The linkage of the Garo-Boro languages with Konyak and Jingphaw languages suggest that proto-Garo-Boro entered Assam from somewhere to the northeast. It has been proposed that the proto-Garo-Boro language was a lingua franca of different linguistic communities, not all of who were native speakers, and that it began as a creolized lingua franca. This would account for the highly reduced morphology of Garo–Boro, with what morphology is present mostly being regular, loosely bound, and with transparent etymology, typical signs of recent origin.

Classification

Joseph & Burling (2006)

Joseph & Burling (2006:1-2) classify the Boro–Garo languages into four major groups. Wood (2008:6) also follows this classification.
Deori
Boro languages: Boro, Kokborok, Tiwa
Garo
Koch languages: Koch, Rabha, Wanang, Atong, and Ruga

Jacquesson (2006)
Jacquesson (2017:112) classifies the Boro-Garo languages as follows, and recognizes three major branches (Western, Central, and Eastern). The Koch languages and Garo are grouped together as Western Boro-Garo.
Western
Garo,
Rabha, Koch
Central
Boro, Mech
Bru
Dimasa, Moran
Kokborok
Eastern
Deori

Jacquesson (2017) believes that the Boro–Garo languages had arrived in their present location from the southeast, and notes similarities shared with Zeme languages and Kuki-Chin languages.

Reconstruction
Proto-Boro–Garo has been reconstructed by Joseph and Burling (2006) and by Wood (2008).

See also
List of Proto-Boro-Garo reconstructions (Wiktionary)
Reang

Notes

References

Joseph, U.V., and Burling, Robbins. 2006. Comparative phonology of the Boro Garo languages. Mysore: Central Institute of Indian Languages Publication.

Further reading
 
 

Sal languages
Languages of India